Ruleton is an unincorporated community in Sherman County, Kansas, United States.

History
The first post office in Ruleton was established in 1887.

Ruleton contains the Ruleton School, listed on the National Register of Historic Places.

References

Further reading

External links
 Sherman County maps: Current, Historic, KDOT

Unincorporated communities in Sherman County, Kansas
Unincorporated communities in Kansas